The Jamaica national netball team travelled to England in January 2023 for a three-match series against the England national netball team. England won the series 2–1. The matches were played at Manchester Arena and the Copper Box Arena in London.

Background
England and Jamaica last competed against each other in 2021; England won that series 2–1. Prior to the series, England were ranked third in the world, and Jamaica were fourth. The series was used as preparation for the 2023 Netball World Cup.

The first match of the series was held at the Manchester Arena and the final two matches took place at the Copper Box Arena in London. In the United Kingdom, the series was shown on BBC TV and online.

Squads

Matches

1st Test
The match was the first international at the Manchester Arena since 2016. Jamaica took an early lead of six goals, before England took the lead in the third quarter. They won the final quarter 24–5. The match attendance was 6,652.

2nd Test
Jhaniele Fowler scored 56 goals as Jamaica came from behind to win the match and level the series. After one quarter, England were ahead 18–12, though Jamaica overturned the deficit and led 31–27 at half time. Jamaica led by 10 goals at one point, but this was reduced to 48–41 after three quarters, for a final score of 61–58.

3rd Test
The final match of the series was a close encounter; after two quarters, Jamaica led by a single goal. In the third quarter, Crystal Plummer was suspended for continuous obstruction, giving England a numerical advantage for two minutes. England scored narrowly more goals in the third and fourth quarters to win 63–59. As a result, England won the series 2–1.

References

2023 in netball
International netball competitions hosted by England
England national netball team series
January 2023 sports events in the United Kingdom
2023 sports events in London
International sports competitions in Manchester
2023 in English netball